Mikhail Roginsky (14 August 1931 – 5 July 2004) was a Russian painter. Roginsky was one of the leaders of Soviet Nonconformist Art and the creator of the modern national visual method, with its laconic means and inner expressiveness.

Biography 
In 1978, Roginsky moved to Paris. One year before his emigration he had gone back to documentary art and did a series of five or six works with cans. "I felt (he explained) that I had to go back to what I had begun with, to return to myself". He left Russia shortly after he had finished that series. Roginsky answer to the question whether the West had any influence on him, was brief: "Sure". But he could not say exactly what. "Everything, (he believes) a different life, a different atmosphere, a different reality. I am generally very much influenced by where I live, what I see around me, what kind of art I behold and the type of people I rub shoulders with'".

He died on 5 July 2004 in Paris.

References

External links 
Russia Info-Centre: Photograph and samples of his work

20th-century Russian painters
Russian male painters
21st-century Russian painters
1931 births
2004 deaths
20th-century Russian male artists
21st-century Russian male artists